Uroš Nemanjić may refer to:

 Stefan Uroš I Nemanjić, King of Serbia (1243–1276)
 Stefan Uroš II Nemanjić, King of Serbia (1282–1321)
 Stefan Uroš III Nemanjić, King of Serbia (1321–1331)
 Stefan Uroš IV Nemanjić, King and Emperor  of Serbia (1331–1355)
 Stefan Uroš V Nemanjić, King and Emperor of Serbia (1355–1371)
 Simeon Uroš Nemanjić, Lord of Epirus and Thessaly, self-styled Emperor (1356-1370)
 Jovan Uroš Nemanjić, Lord of Thessaly, self-styled Emperor (1370-1373)

See also
 Uroš, a Serbian given name
 Uroš I (disambiguation)
 Uroš II (disambiguation)
 Stefan Uroš (disambiguation)
 Uroš Vukanović (disambiguation)